The original South Korean counterpart of the television mystery music game show I Can See Your Voice premiered the fifth season on Mnet and tvN on February 2, 2018, following a Global Stars special that aired on January 26, 2018.

Gameplay

Format
Under the original format, the guest artist can eliminate one or two mystery singers after each round. The game concludes with the last mystery singer standing which depends on the outcome of a duet performance with a guest artist.

Rewards
If the singer is good, he/she will have release a digital single; if the singer is bad, he/she wins . For the premiere episode, the winning singer, regardless of being good or bad, receives a microphone trophy.

Rounds
Each episode presents the guest artist with six people whose identities and singing voices are kept concealed until they are eliminated to perform on the "stage of truth" or remain in the end to perform the final duet.

Episodes

Guest artists

Panelists

Postseason Showcase (April 27, 2018)
In the season finale, this episode includes an encore concert that featured former good singers returning to perform one last time, as well as rankings on mystery singers' performances for the past four seasons, including the current one.

Reception

Television ratings

Sources: Nielsen Media and

Notes

References

I Can See Your Voice (South Korean game show)
2018 South Korean television seasons